Pfitzneriana allura is a moth of the family Hepialidae. It is found in Bolivia.

References

Moths described in 1961
Hepialidae